The Coretta Scott King Award is an annual award presented by the Ethnic & Multicultural Information Exchange Round Table, part of the American Library Association (ALA). Named for Coretta Scott King, wife of Martin Luther King Jr., this award recognizes outstanding books for young adults and children by African Americans that reflect the African-American experience.  Awards are given both to authors and to illustrators.

The first author award was given in 1970.  In 1974, the award was expanded to honor illustrators as well as authors. Starting in 1978, runner-up Author Honor Books have been recognized.  Recognition of runner-up Illustrator Honor Books began in 1981. 
In addition, the Coretta Scott King Awards committee has given the Virginia Hamilton Award for Lifetime Achievement, starting in 2010, and beginning in 1996 an occasional John Steptoe Award for New Talent.

Like the Newbery Medal and Caldecott Medal, the Coretta Scott King Awards have the potential to be used in classroom teaching and projects.

History

The idea for the Coretta Scott King Award came from Glyndon Flynt Greer, a school librarian in Englewood, New Jersey. At a meeting of the American Library Association in Atlantic City in 1969, Greer, librarian Mabel McKissick, and publisher John M. Carroll, lamented the lack of recognition for minority writers. No person of color had won either the Newbery or Caldecott Medals at that time. Before the conference ended, a group of African American librarians had formed to promote the creation of a new award.  Among them were Augusta Braxton Baker, Charlemae Hill Rollins, and Virginia Lacy Jones.  The award's name was intentionally chosen to honor recently assassinated Martin Luther King Jr. and his wife, Coretta Scott King. The name also commemorates the life of Dr. King and honors the dedication Coretta Scott King had to making the world a place that welcomes all people.

It was particularly fitting that the first Coretta Scott King Award was presented to Lillie Patterson, a librarian in Baltimore, for her elementary level biography Martin Luther King, Jr.: Man of Peace. The award's first presentation was held during the 1970 New Jersey Library Association conference in Atlantic City, and its second at the corresponding conference in 1971.  Early sponsors of the award included the New Jersey Library Association, and the library councils of the Englewood Middle School and Dwight Morrow High School.

With support from Roger McDonough, the third annual Coretta Scott King Award was presented during the American Library Association's 1972 Annual Conference in Chicago, Illinois. However, the award was not yet officially recognized by the ALA.  As of 1972, Greer moved to Atlanta, Georgia.  The award was briefly sponsored by the School of Library and Information Studies at Atlanta University.  An awards committee and an advisory board of mostly local librarians were formed, co-chaired by Ella Gaines Yates.

In 1974, the award was expanded to honor illustrators as well as authors. The first illustrator to receive the award was George Ford, for his work in illustrating Ray Charles by Sharon Bell Mathis. Mathis won the author award for 1974.
Starting in 1978, runner-ups to the Author award have been recognized as Honor Books. As of 1981, runner-ups to the Illustrator award have been recognized as Honor Books.

In 1979, the awards committee and the advisory board merged, forming the Coretta Scott King Award Task Force. With support from E. J. Josey, the new committee became part of the Social Responsibilities Round Table (SRRT) of the American Library Association. Greer served as its first chair until her death on August 24, 1980. Harriet Brown then became acting chair.

Brown was succeeded by Effie Lee Morris in 1981.
Under Morris' leadership, the Coretta Scott King Awards were officially recognized by the executive board of the ALA. Morris wrote formal selection criteria for the awards to meet ALA's standards, and the Coretta Scott King Awards were accepted as an ALA unit award in 1982, the twelfth year that they had been given.

Winning books receive a medal; honor books receive a certificate.
Winning and honor books are identified by the presence on their covers of the Coretta Scott King Award Seal.  The original seal was designed by artist Lev Mills in 1974, with a bronze seal on winning books and a pewter seal on honor books. In a later revision of the seal, the colors changed to bronze and black for winners, and pewter and black for honors.

The award eventually changed its ALA affiliation from the SRRT to the Ethnic and Multicultural Information Exchange Round Table (EMIERT), which had become a closer match for its activities.
Dr. Henrietta M. Smith has edited four volumes, published by the American Library Association, that provide a history of the award.

From 1996 on, the Coretta Scott King Awards program includes the John Steptoe Award for New Talent, optionally awarded to an author, an illustrator, or both.

Recipients

Hamilton Award for Lifetime Achievement 

From 2010 the Coretta Scott King Awards include the Coretta Scott King–Virginia Hamilton Award for Lifetime Achievement, or Virginia Hamilton Award. It is presented to creators and practitioners alternately: in even years, to an African American writer or illustrator of books for children or young adults; in odd years, to a practitioner for "active engagement with youth using award-winning African American literature for children and/or young adults, via implementation of reading and reading related activities/programs."

 2010: Walter Dean Myers, author
 2011: Dr. Henrietta Mays Smith, professor emerita at the University of South Florida, Tampa, School of Library and Information Science
 2012: Ashley Bryan, storyteller, artist, author, poet, and musician
 2013: Demetria Tucker, family and youth services librarian for the Pearl Bailey Library, a branch of the Newport News (Va.) Public Library System
 2014: Patricia and Fredrick McKissack, children's authors
 2015: Deborah D. Taylor, young adult librarian
 2016: Jerry Pinkney, illustrator
 2017: Dr. Rudine Sims Bishop, Professor Emerita of Education at Ohio State University
 2018: Eloise Greenfield, author
 2019: Dr. Pauletta Brown Bracy, Professor of Library Science and Director of the Office of University Accreditation at North Carolina Central University
 2020: Mildred Taylor, author
 2021: Dorothy L. Guthrie, retired librarian, district administrator, author and school board member
 2022: Nikki Grimes, author
 2023: Dr. Claudette McLinn, retired librarian and bookseller

See also

 Timeline of African-American children's literature

References

External links

American children's literary awards
American librarianship and human rights
American Library Association awards
Awards established in 1970
Awards honoring African Americans
Coretta Scott King
Illustrated book awards
Literary awards honoring minority groups
English-language literary awards